Nature Reviews Gastroenterology & Hepatology is a peer-reviewed medical journal published by Nature Portfolio. It was established in 2004 as Nature Clinical Practice Gastroenterology & Hepatology and obtained its current title in April 2009. The editor-in-chief is Katrina Ray.

Scope 
The content includes editorial and opinion pieces, highlights from the current literature, commentaries on the application of recent research to practical patient care, reviews, and case studies. The scope includes pathology, diagnosis, and treatment of diseases of the gastrointestinal tract, liver, pancreas, gall bladder, and biliary tract, such as functional gastrointestinal disorders, inflammatory diseases, cancer, infection, and nutritional disorders.

Abstracting and indexing 
The journal is abstracted and indexed by:

According to the Journal Citation Reports, the journal has a 2021 impact factor of 73.082, ranking it 1st out of 93 journals in the category "Gastroenterology & Hepatology".

References

External links 
 

Nature Research academic journals
Publications established in 2004
Monthly journals
English-language journals
Review journals